Bilecik HSR station, short for Bileck High Speed Rail station, ( short for Bilecik Yüksek Hızlı Tren garı) is a railway station on the Ankara–Istanbul high-speed railway just east of Bilecik, Turkey. The station opened on 1 June 2015, almost a year after the opening of the Eskişehir-Istanbul portion of the high-speed railway, and is for the moment one of three railway station in Turkey dedicated to high-speed rail. Bilecik YHT has the same layout as the Polatlı YHT railway station; two tracks served by two side platforms and two passing tracks in the middle, as all scheduled YHT trains do not stop at Bilecik.

Prior to the opening of the high-speed railway, the now indefinitely closed Bilecik station, located south of the town and the YHT station, was serviced by many trains running from Istanbul to Ankara and points beyond. The railway station is expected to re-open to passenger traffic, once the construction of the Marmaray commuter rail system in Istanbul is finished and Intercity train services resume.

Station Layout

External links
Bilecik YHT station information

Railway stations in Bilecik Province
High-speed railway stations in Turkey
Bilecik District
Transport in Bilecik Province
Railway stations opened in 2015
2015 establishments in Turkey
Buildings and structures in Bilecik Province